Qiqihar is the second-largest city in the Heilongjiang province of China, in the west central part of the province. The built-up (or metro) area made up of Longsha, Tiefeng and Jianhua districts had 959,787 inhabitants, while the total population of the prefecture-level city was shrinking to 4,067,489 as of the 2020 census (5,367,003 as of 2010). These are mainly Han Chinese, though the city is also home to thirty-four minorities including Manchus, Daur, and Mongols.

Close to Qiqihar are numerous wetlands and the Zhalong Nature Reserve, famous in China for being home to numerous red-crowned cranes.

Etymology
The Khitan people settled in the region under the Liao dynasty. The word "Qiqi" is a reference to a local river; the word "hari" refers to defense; literally, it means "defense of Qiqi". The name Qiqihar comes from Manchu  (cicihar)

History

Early history

Qiqihar is one of the oldest cities in the northeast of China. The region was originally settled by nomadic Daur and Tungus herdsmen. "Qiqihar" is a Daur word, which means 'border' or 'natural pasture'.
 The city's original name was Bukui, the Chinese transcription of a Daur word meaning "auspicious". The city's oldest mosque, the Bukui Mosque, predates the foundation of the city by seven years. As the Czarist Russian eastward advance to the Pacific coast, Qiqihar became a major garrison center in 1674. In 1691, a stronghold was constructed in Qiqihar because of the Qing government's campaigns against the Mongols. Around 1700 it was a center for Russo-Chinese trade. A military depot with barracks and an arsenal was set up there, and many convicted criminals were exiled to the area. Heilongjiang Martial domiciled in Qiqihar City in 1699. The Qing Dynasty had initially intended to keep the far-northern Heilongjiang province as a semi-pastoral area, separate from the wider Chinese agricultural economy, so it did not allow seasonal urban migrants, such as those from Hebei and Shandong who wished to participate in the Qiqihar fur trade, to own acres and transform the land. After the Russian Empire seized Outer Manchuria according to the unequal treaties of Aigun and Beijing, the Qing made the decision to lift the various restrictions it placed on Northeast China and on Heilongjiang residency in particular, in 1868, 1878, and 1904. It enlisted Han Chinese to help to teach the local Solon people farming techniques, providing materials and tax exemptions to convert them from hunting. In 1903, The completion of the Chinese Eastern Railway made Qiqihar a center for communications between China and Russia. A network of lines radiating from Qiqihar was extended into the northwestern part of Heilongjiang Province including Jiagedaqi and Manzhouli in the late 1920s.

Second Sino-Japanese War

In 1931, Japan used a false flag attack, remembered as the September 18 Incident, to justify moving its Guandong Army to capture major cities in Northeast China that month, starting with Shenyang, Changchun, then Jilin City. General Ma Zhanshan was ordered to act as Governor and Military Commander-in-chief of Heilongjiang Province on October 10, 1931. General Ma declined a Japanese ultimatum to surrender Qiqihar on November 15. However, after the loss of Jiangqiao Campaign, the Japanese began their occupation of Qiqihar on November 19, 1931. Liaoning fell in December, and Harbin in February; the puppet Manchukuo government of the Japanese-occupied territory under General Zhang Jinghui established Qiqihar as its administrative center and of Longjiang province. Qiqihar became a major military base for Guandong Army and its economic importance also grew rapidly. During the occupation, the Imperial Japanese Army established Unit 516 in Qiqihar for research into chemical warfare. A major mustard gas tank left over from the Second Sino-Japanese War buried underground was accidentally damaged in August 2003, causing 43 injuries and one death.

Modern era

After the defeat of Japan, the Democratic Regime Qiqihar Municipal Government was established, under the administration of Nenjiang Province. Japanese forces in Northeast China surrendered to the Soviet Union while other Japanese forces in the rest of China surrendered to the United States. From March to May, Soviet troops progressively withdrew from their positions, giving the People's Liberation Army more notice than the National Revolutionary Army so that the former could occupy more positions in the context of the Chinese Civil War. Qiqihar was controlled by the Communists on April 24, 1946, along with other important regional cities like Changchun, Jilin City, and Harbin. Qiqihar was established as the capital of Heilongjiang Province after the foundation of People's Republic of China in 1949. However, since Songjiang Province was merged into Heilongjiang Province, the provincial capital was transferred to Harbin in 1954. During the first five-year plan of China from 1951 to 1956, many factories including Beiman Special Steel Co. and China First Heavy Industries were aid-constructed by the Soviet Union in Fularji District, making Qiqihar an important center of equipment manufacturing industry in Northeast China. In 1984, Qiqihar was designated to be one of the 13 Larger Municipalities in China by the General Office of the State Council.

Geography
Qiqihar City sits on a land area of 42,289 square kilometers at an altitude of 100–500 meters, with an average elevation of 146 meters.

Border
Qiqihar is located along the middle and lower reaches of the Nen River and the hinterland of Songnen Plain, which is adjacent to the Greater Khingan Range and Hulunbuir Prairie. Bordering prefecture cities are:
Baicheng, Jilin (S)
Daqing (E)
Heihe (N)
Hulunbuir, Inner Mongolia (W)
Suihua (NE)
Hinggan League, Inner Mongolia (W)

Climate
Qiqihar has a cold, monsoon-influenced, humid continental climate (Köppen Dwa), with four distinct seasons. Spring and fall are mild, but short and quick transitions. With monthly percent possible sunshine ranging from 56% in July to 73% in February, the city receives abundant sunshine, with 2,839 hours of bright sunshine annually.

Subdivisions 

Qiqihar is divided into 16 divisions: 7 districts, 8 counties and 1 county-level city.

Demographics
According to the sixth national population census, the population amounted to 5,367,003 people. There are 2,720,725 men and 2,646,278 women. The population age of 0-14 was 691,722, 4,238,140 people aged 15–64 and 437,141 people aged 65 and older.

Economy 
Qiqihar is a heavily industrialized city involved in manufacturing.

In 2009, the city's 95 large-scale equipment manufacturing enterprises, with total assets of 30.6 billion yuan, accounting for the city's industrial enterprises above designated size of 46.5% of total assets, the number of employees 5.2 million, accounting for the city's industrial enterprises above the size of 45.6% of the total number of employees. The main business income of 25.57 billion yuan, industrial added value of 8.05 billion yuan, profits of 1.96 billion yuan, 1.03 billion yuan of taxes, respectively, year on year growth of 2.9%, 3%, 19.6% and 22.3%, accounting for the city's industrial enterprises above designated size were 40.6%, 40%, 44.3% and 31.7%, respectively.

Hospitals 
Qiqihar has 23 hospitals.

Companies 
Companies conducting business in Qiqihar include RT-Mart, Walmart, GOME Electrical Appliances, and Suning Commerce Group.

Banks 
Since Qiqihar is a large city, numerous banks work here. Some of the banks include Bank of China, China Construction Bank, Industrial and Commercial Bank of China, and Agricultural Bank of China.

Tourism 
Qiqihar is very close to the Zhalong Nature Reserve. Also, there is the Longsha park.

Transportation

Airport 
Qiqihar is served by its own domestic airport, Qiqihar Sanjiazi Airport.

Trains 
Qiqihar is well-connected in terms of railway transportation. Trains from Qiqihar Railway Station connect the city with Harbin, Beijing, Dalian, Hangzhou, Xi'an and several other major cities in China. Qiqihar Sanjiazi Airport,  from Qiqihar's downtown area, operates daily flights to Beijing, Guangzhou, Shanghai and other major cities in China. In the district of Ang'angxi, the Harbin-Manzhouli Railway intersects with the Qiqihar-Bei'an Railway.

The Harbin–Qiqihar intercity railway opened on 17 August 2015; it provides frequent high-speed service to Harbin, as well as some direct trains to Beijing.

River 
The Nen River is used to transport material.

Gallery

Education 
Numerous schools exist in the city. Four elementary schools feed into 8 city or county high schools.

There are two universities: Qiqihar University and its medical school.

Sister cities
 New Castle County, Delaware, United States
 Utsunomiya, Tochigi, Japan
 Goyang, Gyeonggi, South Korea
 10th of Ramadan City, Egypt
 Krasnoyarsk, Russia

Notable people from Qiqihar 
 Wanrong - Princess consort to Puyi
 Ma Zhanshan - General
 Zhou Tienong - Vice chair of Standing committee of Congress of China
 Chen Yunlin - politician
 Zhai Zhigang - Astronaut
 Liu Boming - Astronaut
 Bai Xue - 10,000 meter runner
 Mao Buyi - singer-songwriter

Notes

External links 
 Official Website
 Historic US Army map of Qiqihar, 1945

 
Populated places established in the 12th century
1125 establishments
Prefecture-level divisions of Heilongjiang
Cities in Heilongjiang
12th-century establishments in China